Minuscule may refer to:
 of very small size
 Lower case letter, see 
 Mini scule, a species of microhylid frog
 Minuscule script, a group of writing styles in ancient and medieval Greek or Latin manuscripts:
 Minuscule cursive or new Roman cursive, used in Latin manuscripts (3rd–7th century AD)
 Carolingian minuscule, used in western Europe (8th–12th century AD)
 Greek minuscule, used in Greek manuscripts since the 9th century AD
 Some varieties of insular script, used in British Isles in the Early Middle Ages
 Any book written in minuscule script, especially
 Greek biblical manuscripts, New Testament minuscules
 Minuscule (TV series), a French-made animated television series
 Minuscule: Valley of the Lost Ants, a 2013 France/Belgium animated film
 Minuscule (DVD), a video album by Björk
 Minuscule representation in mathematics